The Import Duties Act 1932 (22 & 23 Geo. V c. 8) was an Act of United Kingdom Parliament. The Act introduced a general tariff of 10% on most imports, though some foodstuffs, raw materials, and some imports from the British Empire were exempted. Specifically, the Dominions, India and Southern Rhodesia were exempt from these tariffs until 15 November 1932, when the Imperial Economic Conference at Ottawa would have agreed on a system of Imperial Preference.

The Chancellor of the Exchequer, Neville Chamberlain, introduced the Bill to the House of Commons on 4 February 1932. He had with him his father's old despatch box from when he was Secretary of State for the Colonies and his father's widow was present in the gallery. He explicitly referenced Joseph Chamberlain's crusade for Tariff Reform in his speech:

Upon finishing this speech, Neville's half-brother Austen Chamberlain got up from his seat and shook Neville's hand amidst cheering. The Bill passed the Commons by 454 votes to 78, being opposed by the Labour Party and 32 Liberals. It came into operation on 1 March 1932.

Tariffs could be increased on the recommendation of the Import Duties Advisory Committee which the Act founded. The flat 10% tariff was increased to rates from 15% to 33% for various goods shortly after the Act was passed.

According to Nicholas Kaldor these tariffs encouraged domestic substitution for imports, increasing the UK's general level of manufacturing production during the years 1932–1937 by 48% (or 8.1% a year), a rate of growth not experienced by Britain before or since. Kaldor also claimed that real GDP rose 4% a year during this period, making Britain the world's fastest growing economy (with the possible exception of Nazi Germany). In regards to steel production, Britain was producing 13 million tons in 1937 compared to the 5 million tons produced in 1932 and the pre-Depression peak of 9 million tons in 1929.

Notes

Further reading
H. Leak, 'Some Results of the Import Duties Act', Journal of the Royal Statistical Society, Vol. 100, No. 4. (1937), pp. 558–606.

United Kingdom Acts of Parliament 1932
Economic history of the United Kingdom
1932 in economics
British Empire
History of the Commonwealth of Nations
Customs duties